"Die Hard" is a song by American rappers Kendrick Lamar and Blxst, and Barbadian singer Amanda Reifer. It was sent to rhythmic contemporary radio on August 9, 2022, as the third single from Lamar's fifth studio album, Mr. Morale & the Big Steppers. The song was produced by Sounwave, DJ Dahi, and Lamar's cousin Baby Keem, with co-production by FnZ.

Composition and lyrics
"Die Hard" is a R&B and pop song that contains a "sweet" post-chorus that is sung by Amanda Reifer. The song includes a "floating R&B instrumental and tender introspection". Lamar lightly raps: "I got some regrets". It has a "gentle flute line and a blissful melody", which sees Blxst gently sing on the chorus: "I hope I'm not too late to set my demons straight". In the two verses of the song, Kendrick Lamar uses two different moods as the song is really about how it is never too late to turn wrongs into rights and chasing dreams, with a summertime vibe to it.

Credits and personnel

 Kendrick Lamar – vocals, songwriting
 Blxst – vocals, songwriting
 Boi-1da – production, songwriting
 Sounwave – production, songwriting
 DJ Dahi – production, songwriting
 Baby Keem – production, songwriting, drums
 J. Lbs – production, songwriting
 FnZ
 Michael Mulé – co-production, songwriting
 Isaac De Boni – co-production, songwriting
 Sam Dew – songwriting
 Thundercat – songwriting, bass
 Marvin Eugene Smith – songwriting
 Robert T. "Bob" Smith – songwriting
 Victor Ekpo – songwriting
 Grandmaster Vic – strings
 Manny Marroquin – mixing
 Anthony Vilchis – mixing assistance
 Trey Station – mixing assistance
 Zach Pereyra – mixing assistance
 Andrew Boyd – recording assistance
 Wesley Seidman – recording assistance
 Joe Visciano – engineering
 Beach Noise
 Matt Schaeffer – engineering
 Johnny Kosich – engineering
 Johnathan Turner – engineering
 Ray Charles Brown, Jr. – engineering

Charts

Weekly charts

Year-end charts

Release history

References

2022 singles
2022 songs
Kendrick Lamar songs
Songs written by Kendrick Lamar
Songs written by Sounwave
Songs written by DJ Dahi
Songs written by Sam Dew
Songs written by Thundercat (musician)
Interscope Records singles
Aftermath Entertainment singles
Top Dawg Entertainment singles
Pop songs